The 6th Pioneer Regiment is a military engineer regiment of the Italian Army based in the Cecchignola quarter of Rome. Today the regiment is administratively assigned to the army's Engineer Command and the army's sole pioneer unit, whose focus, unlike the army's other engineer units, is on rear area construction tasks.

History 
On 1 October 1922 the 4th Army Corps Engineer Grouping was formed in Bologna, which received the Sappers Battalion and the Telegraphers Battalion of the VI Army Corps, and a miners company from the disbanded Miners Engineer Regiment. The grouping consisted of a command, a sappers-miners battalion, a telegraphers battalion, a photo-electricians company, two dovecotes (in Bologna and Treviso, which was later replaced by a dovecote in Ancona), and a depot. On 1 November 1926 the grouping was renamed 6th Engineer Regiment.

In February 1928 the regiment provided a sappers-miners company and telegraphers company for the formation of the 11th Engineer Regiment. On 28 October 1932 the regiment received the II Battalion of the disbanded 1st Radio-Telegraphers Regiment. In January 1937 the telegraphers and radio-telegraphers battalions were renamed connections battalions.

World War II 
With the outbreak of World War II the regiment's depot began to mobilize new units:

 Command of the 3rd Engineer Grouping
 IX Mixed Engineer Battalion (for the Alpine Army Corps)
 XVII Mixed Engineer Battalion (for the 17th Infantry Division "Pavia")
 CCII Mixed Engineer Battalion (for the 2nd CC.NN. Division "28 Ottobre")
 CXVI Mixed Engineer Battalion (for the 16th Infantry Division "Pistoia")
 CLIII Mixed Engineer Battalion (for the 153rd Infantry Division "Macerata")
 CLV Mixed Engineer Battalion (for the 155th Infantry Division "Emilia")
 XI Engineer Battalion
 XXIV Engineer Battalion
 III Telegraphers Battalion
 III Marconists Battalion
 and many smaller units

The 3rd Engineer Grouping was mobilized on 11 June 1940 and in April 1941 participated in the invasion of Yugoslavia. The grouping was then assigned to the 2nd Army for occupation duty in Yugoslavia and based in Sušak. After the announcement of the Armistice of Cassibile on 8 September 1943 the grouping in Sušak and the 6th Engineer Regiment in Bologna were disbanded by invading German forces.

Cold War 

On 1 May 1952 the Engineer Battalion "Granatieri di Sardegna" was formed in Civitavecchia by expanding the Engineer Company "Granatieri di Sardegna". The company carried the traditions of the 54th Engineer Company formed in 1940 for the 21st Infantry Division "Granatieri di Sardegna", which defended Rome against German troops after the announcement of the .Armistice of Cassibile. In 1955 the battalion moved from Civitavecchia to Rome.

During the 1975 army reform the army disbanded the regimental level and newly independent battalions were granted for the first time their own flags. During the reform engineer battalions were named for a lake if they supported a corps or named for a river if they supported a division or brigade. On 1 January 1976 the Engineer Battalion "Granatieri di Sardegna" was renamed 6th Engineer Battalion "Trasimeno" and assigned the flag and traditions of the 6th Engineer Regiment, and the traditions of the 54th Engineer Company. The battalion was assigned to the Central Military Region and consisted of a command, a command and park company, and three engineer companies. In 1988 the command and park company split into a command and services company, and a special equipment company.

Recent Times 
On 3 September 1993 the 6th Engineer Battalion "Trasimeno" was disbanded and the next day the 6th Pioneer Regiment was reformed with the personnel and materiel of the disbanded battalion. On 1 December 1997 the regiment was transferred to the army's Engineer Grouping. After the 1997 Umbria and Marche earthquake the regiment was deployed to the affected areas, where it remained until May 1998, earning a Bronze Medal of Civil Valour for its service.

On 24 January 2005 the regiment formed a second pioneer battalion, which was for named for Lake Nemi near Rome.

After the 2016 earthquake in Central Italy the regiment was deployed to the area and remained there until April 2017, building shelters, clearing debris, and providing engineering services to the affected communities. For its service the regiment was awarded Gold Medal of Army Valour.

Current structure 

As of 2022 the 6th Pioneer Regiment consists of:

  Regimental Command, in Cecchignola
 Command and Logistic Support Company
 Pioneer Battalion "Trasimeno"
 1st Pioneer Company
 2nd Pioneer Company
 3rd Pioneer Company
 Pioneer Battalion "Nemi"
 4th Pioneer Company
 5th Pioneer Company
 6th Pioneer Company

The Command and Logistic Support Company fields the following platoons: C3 Platoon, Transport and Materiel Platoon, Medical Platoon, Commissariat Platoon, and EOD Platoon. Each of the two pioneer battalions fields three construction companies with the necessary equipment to build camps, airfields, lodging, roads, etc.

External links
Italian Army Website: 6° Reggimento Genio Pionieri

References

Engineer Regiments of Italy